Unum is an American insurance company.

Unum may also refer to:

 Unum (number format), a suggested replacement for the IEEE floating point format
 Unum ex Quator or simply Unum, a 12th-century text by Clement of Llanthony

See also
 Unam sanctam, a 1302 papal bull
 E pluribus unum (disambiguation) (Latin: Out of Many, One)